Garrand Hall is a building on the Seattle University campus in the U.S. state of Washington. It opened in 1894.

References

External links

 

1894 establishments in Washington (state)
Buildings and structures completed in 1894
Seattle University campus